Westerbeck may refer to several places:

In Lower Saxony 

 Westerbeck (Ebersdorf), a village in Ebersdorf, Lower Saxony
 Westerbeck (Osterholz-Scharmbeck), a village in Osterholz-Scharmbeck
 Westerbeck (Sassenburg), a village in Sassenburg

In North Rhine-Westphalia 

 Westerbeck (Lienen), a village in Lienen
 Westerbeck (Westerkappeln), a village in Westerkappeln